Halifax County High School is a public high school located in South Boston, Virginia, United States. Having 2,319 students currently enrolled in the 2017–18 school year, there are 118 faculty members with a 15.1 student/teacher ratio. At Halifax County High, students have the opportunity to take Advanced Placement course work and testing. Halifax County High School is equipped with two football fields, one soccer field, one field for baseball, and a basketball arena. Halifax County high school currently runs on the semester system. The student body makeup is 49 percent male and 51 percent female, and the total minority enrollment is 51 percent. Halifax County High is the only high school in the Halifax County Public Schools. Halifax County High School has an 82.2 percent on-time graduation rate and a 2.1 percent drop out rate.

The school is a part of Halifax County Public Schools and, in athletics, the AAA Northwest Region of the Virginia High School League.

Academics 
Halifax County High School is a comprehensive high school for grades 9–12, and the only high school in Halifax County Public Schools. Of the 1,827 students in the school, 51% are African American (937), 47% are White (861), and 1% are Hispanic (25).

Athletics 
Halifax High competes in the Virginia High School League's 4a Region, and are in the Piedmont District. The school fields 16 different sports in baseball, boys' and girls' basketball, cross country, football, boys' and girls' golf, boys' and girls' soccer, softball, boys' and girls' tennis, track and field, girls' volleyball, wrestling, and swimming diving & JV/ Varsity cheerleading

Clubs and organizations 
DECA, HOSA, JROTC, FFA, FBLA, FCCLA, FEA, YOVASO, Teens 4 Christ, Voices, Robotics Club, National Honor Society, Latin Club, and Peer Mediation, and the Comet Crazies.

YOVASO 

After a car accident claimed the lives of 2 Comets, the YOVASO club was founded in memory of those that have died from car accidents in the past. The club's goal is to educate the students and the teachers about the dangers of distracted driving. The student-driven club has chapters throughout the state of Virginia. Since the club chapter was founded, the high school has not had another death by car wreck as of May 5, 2020.

DECA 
The DECA club prepares emerging leaders and entrepreneurs for careers in marketing, finance, hospitality and management in high schools and colleges around the globe.

Notable alumni
 Jeb Burton, NASCAR Camping World Truck Series driver
 Alonzo Coleman, former NFL player
 Terry Davis, Former NBA center : most known for his stint on the Dallas Mavericks
 Tyrone Davis, former NFL player
 Earl Ferrell, former NFL player
 Adam Page, current professional wrestler signed to All Elite Wrestling
 Jeremy Jeffress, Current MLB player (Milwaukee Brewers, Kansas City Royals)
 Don Testerman, former NFL player
 Tisha Waller  is an American athlete who participated in the 1996 Summer Olympics and 2004 Summer Olympics
 Barry Word, former NFL player

See also 
 List of school divisions in Virginia

References

External links 
 

Public high schools in Virginia
Schools in Halifax County, Virginia
1979 establishments in Virginia
Educational institutions established in 1979